= Canoeing at the 2010 South American Games – Women's K-1 1000 metres =

The Women's K-1 1000m event at the 2010 South American Games was held over March 27 at 9:00.

== Medalists ==
Gold	Silver	Bronze
Maria Fernanda Lauro; Argentina	Tatiana Muñoz; Colombia	Naiane Pereira; Brazil

== Results ==
Rank	Athlete	Time
1st place, gold medalist(s)	Maria Fernanda Lauro (ARG)	4:11.97
2nd place, silver medalist(s)	Tatiana Muñoz (COL)	4:13.72
3rd place, bronze medalist(s)	Naiane Pereira (BRA)	4:17.82
4	Stefanie Marilin Vinces (ECU)	4:23.83
5	Andreina Silva (VEN)	4:49.34
	Yanara Santander (CHI)	DNF
